Lygaeoidea Species File lists these 98 species in Plinthisus, a genus of dirt-colored seed bugs in the family Rhyparochromidae.

Plinthisus species

 Plinthisus acanthothorax Kiritshenko, 1931
 Plinthisus acrocephalus Slater & Sweet, 1977
 Plinthisus afer Horvath, 1906
 Plinthisus alpinus Linnavuori, 1978
 Plinthisus americanus Van Duzee, 1910
 Plinthisus andalusicus Wagner, 1963
 Plinthisus angulatus Horvath, 1876
 Plinthisus australiensis Slater & Sweet, 1977
 Plinthisus basilewskyi Scudder, 1962
 Plinthisus bassianus Slater & Sweet, 1977
 Plinthisus bembidioides Josifov & Kerzhner, 1978
 Plinthisus beniamaricus Linnavuori, 1978
 Plinthisus brachyoccus Sweet & Slater, 2004
 Plinthisus brevipennis (Latreille, 1807)
 Plinthisus brunneus (Distant, 1918)
 Plinthisus canariensis Wagner, 1963
 Plinthisus cautus Popov, 1965
 Plinthisus cerinus Putschkov, 1976
 Plinthisus chilensis Slater, 1971
 Plinthisus compactus (Uhler, 1904)
 Plinthisus convexus Fieber, 1864
 Plinthisus coracinus Horvath, 1876
 Plinthisus dampieris Slater & Sweet, 1977
 Plinthisus daneghanus Linnavuori & van Harten, 2000
 Plinthisus debaroensis Linnavuori, 1989
 Plinthisus drakensbergensis Sweet & Slater, 2004
 Plinthisus ericae Sweet & Slater, 2004
 Plinthisus fasciatus Horvath, 1882
 Plinthisus flavipes Fieber, 1861
 Plinthisus flindersi (Slater & Sweet, 1977)
 Plinthisus fynbosi Sweet & Slater, 2004
 Plinthisus grossi (Slater & Sweet, 1977)
 Plinthisus hebeiensis Zheng, 1981
 Plinthisus herbarum Lindberg, 1958
 Plinthisus heteroclitus Matocq & Pluot-Sigwalt, 2013
 Plinthisus himyaritus Linnavuori, 1978
 Plinthisus hirsutus Slater, 1964
 Plinthisus hirtus Zheng, 1981
 Plinthisus indentatus Barber, 1918
 Plinthisus japonicus (Hidaka, 1962)
 Plinthisus jordiribesi Rieger & Pagola-Carte, 2011
 Plinthisus kangarooensis Slater & Sweet, 1977
 Plinthisus kanyukovae Vinokurov, 1981
 Plinthisus kilimensis Horvath, 1906
 Plinthisus laevigatus Puton, 1884
 Plinthisus laevis Linnavuori, 1978
 Plinthisus lamprus Sweet & Slater, 2004
 Plinthisus lativentris Horvath, 1906
 Plinthisus lepineyi Vidal, 1940
 Plinthisus longicollis Fieber, 1861
 Plinthisus longisetosus Barber, 1918
 Plinthisus lucidus Linnavuori, 1978
 Plinthisus maculatus (Kiritshenko, 1931)
 Plinthisus magnieni Pericart & Ribes, 1994
 Plinthisus major Horvath, 1876
 Plinthisus marginatus Ferrari, 1874
 Plinthisus martini Van Duzee, 1921
 Plinthisus megacephalus Horvath, 1876
 Plinthisus mehadiensis Horvath, 1882
 Plinthisus minutissimus (Fieber, 1864)
 Plinthisus mixtus Kiritshenko, 1951
 Plinthisus mullewa Slater & Sweet, 1977
 Plinthisus muticus Slater, 1964
 Plinthisus neotropicalis Slater, 1971
 Plinthisus noctivagus (Linnavuori, 1978)
 Plinthisus nudus Slater & Sweet, 1977
 Plinthisus obsoletus Horvath, 1886
 Plinthisus otini Vidal, 1951
 Plinthisus pallens Linnavuori, 1978
 Plinthisus pallidus Barber, 1918
 Plinthisus parviceps (Wagner, 1961)
 Plinthisus parvioculatus Slater, 1971
 Plinthisus patruelis Horvath, 1914
 Plinthisus peninsularis Sweet & Slater, 2004
 Plinthisus perpusillus Wagner, 1963
 Plinthisus pilosellus Horvath, 1876
 Plinthisus platycephalus Slater & Sweet, 1977
 Plinthisus proteus Scudder, 1962
 Plinthisus ptilioides Puton, 1874
 Plinthisus pulchellus Sweet & Slater, 2004
 Plinthisus pusillus (Scholtz, 1847)
 Plinthisus putoni Horvath, 1876
 Plinthisus pygmaeus Horvath, 1882
 Plinthisus reticulatus Slater & Sweet, 1977
 Plinthisus reyi Puton, 1882
 Plinthisus rudebecki Slater, 1964
 Plinthisus saundersi Horvath, 1893
 Plinthisus scutellatus Zheng, 1981
 Plinthisus sericeus Slater & Sweet, 1977
 Plinthisus soongoricus Kerzhner, 1962
 Plinthisus subtilis Horvath, 1882
 Plinthisus tasmaniensis Slater & Sweet, 1977
 Plinthisus tindalis (Slater & Sweet, 1977)
 Plinthisus tineoides (Distant, 1901)
 Plinthisus vestitus Jakovlev, 1889
 Plinthisus woodwardi Slater & Sweet, 1977
 Plinthisus yunnanus Zheng, 1981
 Plinthisus zuurbergi Sweet & Slater, 2004

References

Plinthisus